RPM Year-End charts are a cumulative measure of a single or album's performance in Canada, based upon the RPM magazine charts during any given chart year.

RPM year-end number ones

See also
Billboard Year-End

References

RPM (magazine) charts
Lists of number-one songs in Canada
Lists of number-one albums in Canada